"Burn" is the fifteenth song from Act 2 of the musical Hamilton, based on the life of Alexander Hamilton, which premiered on Broadway in 2015. Lin-Manuel Miranda wrote both the music and lyrics to the song. The song is sung by the character Eliza Hamilton, originally performed by Phillipa Soo.

Background
As Ron Chernow describes in his biography Alexander Hamilton, for which the show was based, "Eliza Hamilton was a modest, self-effacing woman who apparently destroyed her own letters and tried to expunge her presence from the history books." The song draws on Lin-Manuel Miranda's interpretation of Chernow's assumption that Eliza destroyed some of her correspondence with her husband.

Synopsis
"Burn" comes just after Alexander Hamilton, hoping to salvage his professional legacy, admits to his extramarital affair in a public pamphlet. Eliza finds herself as collateral damage in the matter, feeling shattered and betrayed by the revelation. The heartbreak and public humiliation drive her to take control of the story by burning the love letters Hamilton wrote to her.

Analysis
Several critics pointed out the apparent meta-references in some of the song's lyrics.

Writing for The New Yorker, Michael Shulman noted that, "Surely Miranda is poking fun at his own lack of primary sources when it came to dramatizing this moment in the Hamiltons' marriage. But in embracing the enigma the song points to the larger problem of women's history: the public records are thinner, the milieu is mostly domestic, and there's more need for speculation. What was Eliza really thinking? Was burning her letters the only act of personal agency she had left?"

HuffPosts Elizabeth Logan added that, "It's telling that Eliza refers again and again to Angelica's view on the crisis [of Hamilton's cheating]. This marriage was never just the two of them."

Critical reception
The song received critical acclaim, particularly for Soo's performance. Nora Dominick of Entertainment Monthly said that, "the track makes a lasting impact on the Hamilton album as a whole" and that it "is sure to become another classic number from Hamilton, and it's all thanks to Soo and her strong, heartbreaking portrayal of Eliza."

Writing for The Young Folks, Matt Rice ranked the song #13 out of the album's 46 songs. The Odyssey's Bayleigh Reeves ranked the song #8, and BuzzFeed listed it as #3.

Certifications

Mixtape version 

"Burn" is a song from The Hamilton Mixtape performed by Andra Day.

Background
At the time of recording, Day had not yet seen the musical on Broadway, but was familiar with the story. "I was actually obsessed with Alexander Hamilton in school," she said. She chose to cover "Burn" after being drawn to the "raw, fiery, painful emotion" of Eliza in the song. "I already had such an empathy for her. Even before the show came out, I was like, 'You know what? The guy's a dirtbag.'"

Music video
A music video for the song was released on August 29, 2018. The video was directed by Aurora Guerrero. Guerrero was recommended to Miranda by famed director Ava DuVernay after Miranda reached out to DuVernay to connect him with a director that he did not already know. Miranda later commented that he was "crazy about" the video that Guerrero put together.

Critical reception
Marissa Martinelli of Slate ranked the song #4 out of the album's 23 songs. She called Day's version "devastating" and concluded that, "Compositionally, this cover plays it safe, but Day brings such rage and heartbreak to the song that it’s more than just a retread."

Hamildrop version

"First Burn" is the fifth promotional single of the Hamildrops collection. The song was released on April 30, 2018, and features five actress who had played Eliza Hamilton at notable productions of the musical: Arianna Afsar (original Chicago company), Julia Harriman (first and third national tour), Shoba Narayan (original second national tour company), Rachelle Ann Go (original West End company) and Lexi Lawson (Broadway).

Background
The song is the first draft of "Burn" written by Miranda. Discussing its function within the musical and how the song evolved, Miranda said that, "In the final 'Burn' [Eliza] has agency, and makes a decision to destroy Hamilton’s best self. In this draft she’s angrier, but it’s entirely reactive."

He also stated that the draft version worked "as a song but not as a scene" due to the lack of dramatic tension from Eliza burning the letters right from the start, as well as certain lyrics giving away the last song in the show, diminishing it.

References

Songs from Hamilton (musical)
2015 songs
Songs written by Lin-Manuel Miranda